(lit. Vulture Peak Temple) is a Kōya-san Shingon temple in Naruto, Tokushima Prefecture, Japan. Temple 1 of the Shikoku 88 temple pilgrimage, the main image is of Shaka Nyorai. Said to have been founded by Gyōki during the Tempyō era, its buildings are more recent replacements after damage by fires. Located close to the crossing point for pilgrims from the Kansai region, Yūben Shinnen identified the temple as No.1 in his Shikoku henro michishirube of 1687 and subsequent guidebooks followed suit. It is customary to return to Ryōzen-ji as an orei mairi or thanksgiving visit upon completing the pilgrimage, although this may be a relatively recent development.

See also

 Tōrin-in
 Vulture Peak
 Shikoku 88 temple pilgrimage

References

Buddhist pilgrimage sites in Japan
Buddhist temples in Tokushima Prefecture
Kōyasan Shingon temples
Jingū-ji
Naruto, Tokushima